The Rukenya Dam, also known as Thiba Dam, is a dam currently under construction (as of January 2020) in Rukenya, Kirinyaga County, Kenya. The dam will be 40 meters high and 1 km wide, and its reservoir will occupy at least 542 acres of land, with a water storage capacity of 15 million cubic meters.

The main purpose of this dam is to increase the land under irrigation in Mwea Irrigation Scheme.  The project will be funded by the Government of Kenya in partnership with the Japan International Cooperation Agency. The cabinet proposed the construction of the dam as a Vision 2030 project.

Construction began in September 2016, but was suspended in October 2019 due to a lack of funding. Works resumed in January 2020 thanks to a new $6 million release.

References 

Dams in Kenya
Japan International Cooperation Agency
Dams under construction